Ominous From The Cosmic Inferno is an album by Acid Mothers Temple & The Cosmic Inferno, released in 2007 by Brazilian label Essence Music. The album was limited to one thousand copies and came packaged in a miniature gatefold LP sleeve with pop-up artwork.

Track listing

Personnel
 Tabata Mitsuru - Bass, Vocals, Acoustic Guitar, Maratab
 Okano Futoshi - Drums, Percussion, God Speed
 Shimura Koji - Drums, Percussion, Latino Cool
 Higashi Hiroshi - Electronics, Dancin' King
 Kawabata Makoto - Electric Guitar, Bouzouki, Electronics, Speed Guru

Technical personnel
 Kawabata Makoto - Production and Engineering
 Jason Killinger - Artwork

References

Acid Mothers Temple albums
2007 albums